Chocolate Aguila is an Argentine chocolate brand currently owned and commercialised by Grupo Arcor. "Aguila" was the tradename used by the former company Saint Hermanos S.A., which had been established in 1880, being renowned for its chocolate bars. 

The company was acquired by Grupo Arcor in 1993, becoming a brand of it.

History 
The company was established by French immigrant Abel François Charles Saint (1845–1892), first as a coffee roasting business on Carlos Pellegrini street in Buenos Aires, starting with the production of chocolate in 1880. As the business grewth, Saint opened a factory on Herrera street in Barracas, a neighborhood at south of Buenos Aires, in 1894. Named "Saint Hermanos", the company continued producing roasted coffee and also chocolate, which soon became favorite among Saint's clients.

During the first half the XX century, the firm opened point sales along Argentina, even expanding its business to Uruguay (with a new plant built there) and Paraguay. By 1920, Aguila added ice cream to its portfolio under the brand "Laponia". The company also produced and marketed bonbons, chocolate pastilles, and mint confections among other goods.

Between the 1930s and the 1970s, the former Chocolate Aguila company developed a huge variety of products, manufacturing and commercialising more than 100 different items in its factory located in Barracas. Among those products were Laponia ice creams (which required 700 street vendors to distribute its products), Colibrí bonbons, Aguila Express, and Comprimido Aguila. The company employed 1,800 people by then.

In the 1980s decade, Aguila focused on strategies to advertise its chocolate bar as an ingredient for desserts and cakes. The logo and packaging were redesigned, establishing the pink as the characteristic color that has identified the brand since then.

In 1993, the company was acquired by multinational company Grupo Arcor, which expanded the Aguila brand adding several products (such as ice creams, alfajores, and even candies to its line.

Advertising 

In the 1930s, the company hired famous cook Petrona de Gandulfo (popularly known as "Doña Petrona") to advertise its chocolate. Gandulfo wrote a cook brochure with recipes using Aguila chocolate as main ingredient. Those recipes were then compiled in the anthology volume Doña Petrona Inédita that included more than 1,000 recipes written by Doña Petrona and remained unpublished until then.

In the 1980s, the company broadcast a TV advertisement starring a black man that compared himself (in a humoristic tone) with a blonde hair boy when talking of his childhood, at the end of the piece. The advertisement would become a success and a classic of the brand. Afro-Cuban pianist and actor Rigoberto Díaz de Armas was the actor that played that role. The advertisement has also gained some criticism from sectors who stated that comparing the African culture with chocolate may imply some form of racial stereotyping.

Products 

, products under the Aguila brand include a wide range of chocolate-based products. Apart from its classic bar, Arcor commercialises chips, syrup, alfajores, bonbons, ice creams, and candies.

See also 
 Grupo Arcor, owner

References

External links 

 

a
a
a
a
a
a
a